The 1903 Georgia Bulldogs football team represented the Georgia Bulldogs of the University of Georgia during the 1903 Southern Intercollegiate Athletic Association football season. The Bulldogs completed the season with a 3–4 record.  Georgia lost to Clemson, but beat rivals Georgia Tech and Auburn.  This was the Georgia Bulldogs' first season under the guidance of head coach Marvin M. Dickinson.

John Heisman last year as head coach of Clemson was 1903.  During his four years at Clemson, Georgia was unable to muster a single win, was shut out twice and scored only 10 points.  While Heisman was head coach of Auburn, Georgia had fared a little better, managing a win and a tie and recording a 1–2–1 record.  Nevertheless, during the eight meetings with Heisman-coached teams from 1895 to 1903, Georgia was 1–6–1.

Schedule

References

Georgia
Georgia Bulldogs football seasons
Georgia Bulldogs football